The Kahlheid near Morscheid-Riedenburg in the Idar Forest (Hunsrück) is a mountain, on the boundary between the counties of  Birkenfeld and Bernkastel-Wittlich in the German state of Rhineland-Palatinate.

The mountain is the third highest in Rhineland-Palatinate after the Erbeskopf (816.3 m), 2.6 km to the southwest and its southwestern subpeak, the Springenkopf (784.2 m), in the Schwarzwälder Hochwald, and the peak of An den zwei Steinen (766.2 m), 12 km to the northeast (both distances as the crow flies), also in the Idar Forest.

See also 
 List of mountains and hills in Rhineland-Palatinate

References 

Mountains under 1000 metres
Mountains and hills of Rhineland-Palatinate
Mountains and hills of the Hunsrück
Birkenfeld (district)
Bernkastel-Wittlich